The Banterer-class gunboat was a class of eleven gunboats mounting two 6-inch and two 4-inch guns, built for the Royal Navy between 1880 and 1892.

Design
The Banterer class was designed by Nathaniel Barnaby, the Admiralty Director of Naval Construction. The ships were of composite construction, meaning that the keel, frames, stem and stern posts were of iron, while the hull was planked with timber. This had the advantage of allowing the vessels to be coppered, thus keeping marine growth under control, a problem that caused iron-hulled ships to be frequently docked. In appearance they were distinguishable from the preceding Forester class (also a Barnaby design) by their vertical stems.

Propulsion

Armament
Ships of the class were armed with two 6-inch 64-pounder muzzle-loading rifles (a conversion of the smoothbore 32-pounder 58 cwt gun) and two Armstrong 3.75-inch 20-pounder breech loading guns. A pair of machine guns was also fitted.

Ships

References

Gunboat classes
 
 Banterer